Margarethe "Grete" Lainer (born 20 June 1914, date of death unknown) was an Austrian figure skater who competed in ladies' singles. She finished ninth at the 1936 Winter Olympics.

Results

References

1914 births
Year of death missing
Austrian female single skaters
Olympic figure skaters of Austria
Figure skaters at the 1936 Winter Olympics